The South Taconic Trail is a  hiking trail in the Taconic Mountains of southwest Massachusetts and adjacent New York. The Appalachian Trail, which traverses an adjacent ridgeline in the same mountain range, parallels the South Taconic Trail  to the east. The trails are connected to one another via shorter trails.

Description
The South Taconic Trail passes through the New York towns of Millerton and Copake and the Massachusetts towns of Mount Washington and Egremont. it passes through Taconic State Park, Mount Washington State Forest, and Bash Bish Falls State Park. The trail, marked with white blazes, follows a series of high, open summits and ridgeline overlooking the Hudson River Valley to the west. Overnight camping is allowed on the trail at designated locations on Alander Mountain and at the Copake Falls Campground in Taconic State Park. The trail is maintained by the Berkshire Chapter of the Appalachian Mountain Club, the mid-Hudson chapter of the Adirondack Mountain Club, the New York - New Jersey Trail Conference, and the Sierra Club.

Forest types of the South Taconic Trail are mixed oak-hickory forest and northern hardwood forest with microclimate summit balds and alkaline-loving plant communities. The geology is thrust faulted metamorphic rock over younger sedimentary rock.

Features along the route include the summits of Brace Mountain, Alander Mountain, Sunset Rocks, Mount Fray, and perhaps Massachusetts' most famous waterfall, Bash Bish Falls.

In 2015, the South Taconic Trail Extension was completed, a six-mile section of trail that connects Brace Mountain to Rudd Pond State Park to the South.

See also
The Appalachian Trail
Taconic Trails

References

Massachusetts Trail Guide (2004). Boston: Appalachian Mountain Club.
Commonwealth Connections proposal PDF download. Retrieved March 2, 2008.

External links
South Taconic Range trail map.
Mount Washington State Forest. Massachusetts DCR.
Mount Washington State Forest map
Taconic State Park New York DEC.
Bash Bish Falls State Park. Massachusetts DCR.
Catamount Ski Area
Berkshire Natural Resource Council
Berkshire Chapter of the Appalachian Mountain Club
Mid-Hudson chapter of the Adirondack Mountain Club
The Sierra Club
New York - New Jersey Trail Conference

Protected areas of Berkshire County, Massachusetts
Protected areas of Dutchess County, New York
Hiking trails in Massachusetts
Hiking trails in New York (state)
Taconic Mountains
Tourist attractions in Columbia County, New York